Yaroslav II is the name of:

 Yaroslav II of Kiev (died 1180), Grand Prince of Kiev (1174–1175, 1180)
 Yaroslav II of Vladimir (1191–1246), Grand Prince of Vladimir (1238–1246)